Seth Thomas may refer to:

 Seth Thomas (clockmaker) (1785–1859)
 Seth Thomas Clock Company
 Seth Thomas (judge) (1873–1962)